Simpsonichthys parallelus is a species of killifish from the family Rivulidae.
It is found in Paraná River basin in Brazil in South America. 

References

parallelus
Taxa named by Wilson José Eduardo Moreira da Costa
Fish described in 2000